Cherry is the solo debut album by Canadian singer Lisa Shaw, released in 2005.

Chart performance
The album debuted and peaked at number 20 on the Billboard Dance/Electronic Albums chart dated 12 November 2005. One of the album's singles, "Born to Fly," was also modestly successful, reaching number 25 on the Dance Singles Sales chart.

Track listing
"Cherry" – 3:35
"Don't Know What to Do" – 3:13
"When I" – 4:51
"Grown Apart" – 3:36
"Push-Button" – 3:16
"Hot Skin" – 4:04
"Matter of Time" – 4:32
"Dim Light" – 1:55
"Always" – 4:02
"Born to Fly" – 3:59
"Stylin'" – 3:24
"It's Been Awhile" – 4:59
"The Last Time" – 4:22
"Let It Ride (Jimpster Remix)" – 4:26

Personnel
 Dave Boonshoft – bass, executive producer
 Jay Denes – audio production, composer, keyboards, producer, programming
 Mark Anthony Jones – guitar
 Jennifer Karr – vocals (background)
 Emily Lazar – mastering
 Jamie Odell – keyboards, programming, remixing
 Ricardo Quinones – guitar
 Saul Rubin – guitar
 Lisa Shaw – composer, producer, vocals
 Bill Stair – logistics
 Eric Stamile – audio production, composer, keyboards, producer, programming
 Dave Warrin – composer, producer

References

2005 debut albums
Lisa Shaw albums
Astralwerks albums